Roger Eskeland (born 11 November 1977) is a Norwegian football goalkeeper who currently plays for Norwegian team Bryne FK. He joined the team in 1994, having played for lower league clubs Feda IL and Kvinesdal IL. He played for Bryne in the Norwegian Premier League, and has also played for the Norwegian under-21 team.

References
Club bio 

Norwegian footballers
1977 births
Living people
People from Vest-Agder
Bryne FK players

Association football goalkeepers
Sportspeople from Agder